is a ward of the city of Sakai in Osaka Prefecture, Japan. The ward has an area of 17.94 km² and a population of 121,377. The population density is 6,766 per square kilometer. The name means "Central Ward."

The wards of Sakai were established when Sakai became a city designated by government ordinance on April 1, 2006.

References

External links

Ward office official webpage 

Wards of Sakai, Osaka